Alyona Tymoshenko (born 9 June 1985) is a Ukrainian film producer. She is founder and head of the Ukrainian Film School and producer of creative agency GOODMEDIA. Tymoshenko is a member of the expert commission for the selection of films of the Ukrainian State Film Agency.

Early life 

She graduated from the Kyiv National University of Culture and Arts, majoring in “Management and Business”. In the fifth year, after practice, she stayed to work on the ICTV channel as a casting manager of the “Business Sharks” project.

As a casting director and television editor, she worked in series (“Kateryna”, “Nikonov and Co”, “Vitalka”), TV shows and reality (“Mystical stories”, “Let's get married!”, “Bird in a cage”), advertising (social advertising of the Armed Forces of Ukraine, social advertising of the elections, promo video of the ZIK TV channel, promo video of the 1+1 TV channel, shopping center Ocean Plaza, Kyivstar, Delta Bank).

In 2016, she founded the first film school in Ukraine, Ukrainian Film School, which was created on the basis of FILM.UA Group, the largest film studio in Eastern Europe.  Ukrainian Film School annually graduates more than 800 specialists in the field of the film industry, including the actress of the film “Viddana” Alesya Romanova, the creator of the script for the film about Valeriy Lobanovskyi “The Mentor” Stas Verechuk, participants of Netflix projects and others.

In 2019, Alyona Tymoshenko was included in the list of experts of the pitching commission of the Ukrainian State Film Agency, where she evaluates projects in the categories “Debut film”, “Movie for a wide audience”, “Animation”, “Non-action film”.

In June 2021, Tymoshenko spoke on the topic of education in the field of cinema at the forum “Ukraine 30. Education and Science”.

In 2021, she acted as the initiator of the “Sounds of the City” art installation project. The sounds of the seven cities, associated with the memories and reflections of famous citizens, were recorded and transformed into art objects with the help of sound design and 3D visualization programs. The first sculpture of the project was unveiled by the President of Ukraine Volodymyr Zelenskyy at the Crimean Platform summit. It is dedicated to the Crimea. Art installations "Sounds of the City" were also prepared for Kyiv, Dnipro, Lviv, Odesa, Kharkiv and Mariupol. Alyona Tymoshenko's project was implemented before the 30th anniversary of Ukrainian independence. A team of 117 people worked on it.

Personal life 

Her husband is Kyrylo Tymoshenko, Deputy Head of the Office of the President of Ukraine since May 21, 2019. They have a son Semen.

References

External links 

1985 births
Living people
Ukrainian film producers
Ukrainian women film producers